Laidley  or Laidlay may refer to the following people:

Given name
Laidley Burge (1897–1990), Australian rugby league player

Surname
Dean Laidley (born 1967), Australian rules footballer and coach
James Laidley (1823–1877), Australian politician

 James Laidley (administrator) (1786–1835), Australian administrator

John Laidley (1791–1863), American lawyer and politician
John Watson Laidlay (1808–1885), Scottish merchant, numismatist and orientalist
Johnny Laidlay (1860–1940), Scottish golfer
William Laidley (1828–1897), Australian politician

English-language surnames